This is a list of mayors of Santa Barbara, California since the city's incorporation in April 1850.

See also
 List of mayors of Oxnard, California
 List of mayors of Ventura, California

References

Santa Barbara
Mayors